The Escuela Superior Latinoamericana de Informática (Spanish for "Latin American Superior School of Informatics", ESLAI) was an Argentine undergraduate school of computer science established in 1986. Classes were held in a former countryhouse at the Pereyra Iraola Park in Buenos Aires Province, at approximately 40 km from Buenos Aires.

The school had Argentine mathematician Manuel Sadosky among its main founders. In spite of its short life, it had a considerable impact on informatics teaching and research in Argentina and South America. ESLAI courses were attended by students from several Spanish-speaking countries in South America such as Argentina, Uruguay, Paraguay, Bolivia, Peru, Ecuador, Colombia and Venezuela. All students had a full scholarship and the admission process was passed by about 15% of applicants.

The school established cooperation programs with a number of foreign universities in the Americas as well as in Europe. Those agreements sponsored important visitors to the school, such as Alberto O. Mendelzon, Jean-Raymond Abrial, Ugo Montanari, Carlo Ghezzi and Giorgio Ausiello, and enabled its students to attend graduate school at foreign universities.

The school had a remarkable European influence and was oriented towards theoretical aspects of computer science, such as typed lambda calculus, formal verification, and Martin-Löf's intuitionistic type theory.

Unfortunately, the school was never able to develop a relationship with local companies, which in an emergent economy like Argentina's is essential to be involved with more practical problems. Without financial support, ESLAI had to close down in September 1990 during the presidency of Carlos Menem.

References 

Computer science education
Universities in Argentina